The Illyrian type helmet (or Greco-Illyrian type helmet) is a style of bronze helmet, which in its later variations covered the entire head and neck, and was open-faced in all of its forms. It originated in Peloponnese, ancient Greece, and was developed during the 8th and 7th centuries BC (700–640 BC). Accurate representations on Corinthian vases are sufficient to indicate that the Illyrian type helmet was developed before 600 BC. The helmet is named today as Illyrian type for convenience due to many initial archaeological discoveries coming from the region of Illyria.

Archaeology
According to archaeological evidence, the Illyrian type helmet evolved from the Kegelhelm (or Kegel type) of the Archaic Period found in Argos. The earliest Illyrian type helmets were developed in a workshop located in the northwestern Peloponnese (possibly Olympia), although the first Type II Illyrian helmets were created in Corinthian workshops. The first Type III helmets were created in workshops situated somewhere on the Illyrian coast of the Adriatic. The Illyrian type helmet did not obstruct the wearer's critical senses of vision though the first two varieties hampered hearing. There were four types of these helmets and all were open faced:

Type I (c. 700–640 BC) left the neck unprotected and hampered hearing.
Type II (c. 600 BC) offered neck protection and again hampered hearing.
Type III (c. 550 BC) offered neck protection and allowed better hearing.
Type IV (c. 500 BC) was similar to Type III but hearing was not impaired at all.

The Illyrian type helmet was used by the ancient Greeks, Etruscans, Scythians, and became popular with the Illyrians who later adopted it. A variety of the helm had also spread to Italy based on its appearance on ivory reliefs and on a silver bowl at the "Bernardini" tomb at Praeneste. The helmet became obsolete in most parts of Greece in the early 5th century BC. Its use in Illyria had ended by the 4th century BC.

Gallery

References

Notes

Citations

Sources

Further reading

External links

Ancient Greek helmets
Ancient Peloponnese
Ancient Corinth
Archaic Greece
Illyrian warfare